Hatiteh (also Romanized as Ḩaţīţeh; also known as Atitah and Atīteh) is a village in Joghatai Rural District, in the Central District of Joghatai County, Razavi Khorasan Province, Iran. At the 2006 census, its population was 381, in 102 families.

References 

Populated places in Joghatai County